Armand Thewis (18 April 1893 – 14 January 1960) was a Belgian racing cyclist. He rode in the 1921 Tour de France.

References

1893 births
1960 deaths
Belgian male cyclists
Place of birth missing